(born 10 June 1935 in Tōkamachi, Niigata), is a Japanese actor, who attended Niigata Prefectural Tōkamachi High School and later Toyo University.

Career
While he was at Toyo University, Takahashi became a chauffeur of Seiji Miyaguchi, an actor of the theatrical company . In 1959, he joined Bungakuza, and  made his debut with the play . In 1963, he had a role in the film  directed by Kaneto Shindō.
Subsequent major roles include Oda Nobunaga in the third NHK Taiga Drama Taikōki in 1965, and Lieutenant Hayami in the NHK morning drama series Ohanahan in 1966.

Filmography

Films
Mother (1963) – Haruo
Samurai Spy (1965) – Sasuke Sarutobi
Tempyō no Iraka (1980)Imperial Navy (1981) – UgakiTokyo: The Last Megalopolis (1988) – Kōda RohanGodzilla vs. Biollante (1989) – Dr. Genichiro Shiragami

TelevisionTaikōki  (1965, NHK) – Oda NobunagaTen to Chi to (1969、NHK) – Takeda ShingenShin Heike Monogatari (1972, NHK) – Minamoto no YoritomoŌgon no Hibi (1978, NHK) – Oda NobunagaSekigahara (1981, TBS) – Ōtani YoshitsuguTaiyō ni Hoero!'' (1983, NTV)

References

1935 births
Living people
Japanese male actors
People from Niigata Prefecture